The Conyers Commercial Historic District is a  in Conyers, Georgia which was listed on the National Register of Historic Places in 1988.

The district is roughly bounded by N. Main St., Warehouse St., GA RR, and Center St.  It included 39 contributing buildings, a contributing structure and a contributing object.

See also
National Register of Historic Places listings in Rockdale County, Georgia

References

Historic districts on the National Register of Historic Places in Georgia (U.S. state)
National Register of Historic Places in Rockdale County, Georgia
Victorian architecture in Georgia (U.S. state)
Colonial Revival architecture in Georgia (U.S. state)
Buildings and structures completed in 1845